Gelendzhik Airport  is an airport in Krasnodar Krai, Russia. It serves the resort town of Gelendzhik and the much larger nearby city of Novorossiysk. The airport opened to passengers on 5 June 2010.

History

In December 2021 the building of a new terminal of the Gelendzhik Airport was finished.

Airlines and destinations

References

External links
 Gelendzhik Airport Official website 

Airports in Krasnodar Krai
Basel Aero